Garypinidae is a family of pseudoscorpions, containing the following genera:

Aldabrinus
Amblyolpium
Galapagodinus
Garypinidius
Garypinus
Haplogarypinus
Hemisolinus
Indogarypinus
Nelsoninus
Neoamblyolpium
Neominniza
Oreolpium
Paraldabrinus
Protogarypinus
Pseudogarypinus
Serianus
Solinellus
Solinus
Teratolpium
Thaumatolpium

References 

 
Pseudoscorpion families